Active clearance control (ACC) is a method used in large aircraft gas turbines to improve fuel efficiency during cruise. This is achieved by setting the turbine tip clearance at more than one operating point and contrasts with passive clearance control which sets it for only one condition and is explained below.

As one way to reduce fuel consumption better blade tip sealing has taken on a prominent role in aircraft engine design since the late 1960's. It is used on the CFM International CFM56-5B engine, installed on the Airbus A320, for example.

Background 
Blade tip sealing has been a challenging problem since the development of the gas turbine engine. It is such because the clearance between the blade tips and surrounding casing (shroud) tends to vary due primarily to changes in thermal and mechanical loads on the rotating (turbine wheel) and stationary (stator, turbine casing) structures.

Turbine tip clearance is a leakage path for gas which doesn't flow past the turbine blade aerofoil so doesn't contribute to the power developed by the turbine. As such it reflects a waste of fuel (reduced fuel efficiency). The clearance depends on the thermal growth of a thick-section turbine disc compared to a thin-section turbine case, and also disc radial growth with speed. The three vary, and hence tip clearance, with the engine running condition and clearance is a minimum when the engine first accelerates from idle to take-off, it hasn't had a chance to heat up evenly from being cold at idle although the bladed turbine disc is at maximum speed and so has maximum radial growth from the centrifugal stresses. The thermal effects take longer to stabilize at a steady temperature, ie to give an unvarying tip clearance. This transient condition which gives a minimum clearance is known as a pinch point. The setting of the clearance when the engine is built such that the blade tips don't rub the stationary shrouds in the turbine case at a pinch point condition may be known as passive clearance control.

HPT (high pressure turbine) blade tip clearance has a significant impact on fuel burn and emissions so using ACC gives significant benefits in cruise fuel burn, range, and payload capability for long range aircraft.

Basic system overview 
As an example the CFM International CFM56-5A engine active clearance control uses HPC air for the HPTACC and fan bypass air for the LPTACC. Clearance control is managed by the engine FADEC which consists of an electronic control unit (ECU), an hydromechanical unit (HMU) and HP and LP ACC valves.

References
 https://ntrs.nasa.gov/archive/nasa/casi.ntrs.nasa.gov/20050238447.pdf

Notes

Gas turbine technology
Turbofan engines
Turbines